Donald Richard Luft (February 14, 1930 – June 19, 2002) was a defensive end in the National Football League. He played with the Philadelphia Eagles during the 1954 NFL season.

References

1930 births
2002 deaths
American football defensive ends
Indiana Hoosiers football players
Indiana Hoosiers men's basketball coaches
Philadelphia Eagles players
People from Winnebago County, Wisconsin
Players of American football from Wisconsin